The Bishop of Cashel and Waterford (Full title: Bishop of Cashel and Emly with Waterford and Lismore) was the Ordinary of the Church of Ireland diocese of Cashel and Waterford; comprising all of County Waterford, the southern part of County Tipperary and a small part of County Limerick, Ireland.

History
In the Church of Ireland, although not in the Roman Catholic Church, the bishopric of Waterford and Lismore was united to the archbishopric of Cashel and Emly from 14 August 1833. On the death of Archbishop Laurence of Cashel in 1838, the Province of Cashel was united to the Province of Dublin. The see ceased to be an archbishopric becoming instead the bishopric of Cashel and Waterford.

In 1977, the diocese was split; the former dioceses of Cashel, Waterford and Lismore merged with the "United Dioceses of Ossory, Ferns and Leighlin" to become the United Dioceses of Cashel and Ossory. The remaining part - the former diocese of Emly - was merged with Diocese of Limerick and Killaloe.

List of bishops

References

 
Bishops of Cashel and Ossory
Diocese of Cashel and Ossory
Bishops of Ardmore or Lismore or of Waterford
Cashel and Waterford
Religion in County Waterford